Angelo Maria Querini or Quirini (30 March 1680 – 6 January 1755) was an Italian Cardinal of the Roman Catholic Church.

Biography
Born in Venice, he entered the Benedictine Order in Florence in 1695 and was ordained in 1702. From 1710 to 1714, he undertook extended educational journeys through England, France, Germany, and the Netherlands and corresponded or even met with eminent scholars of his time such as Bernard de Montfaucon, Isaac Newton, or Voltaire. Upon his return to Italy, he was made abbot of the Benedictine monastery in Rome and charged with compiling the annals of the order.

In 1723, he was elected Archbishop of Corfu. Pope Benedict XIII created him Cardinal in pectore in 1726; he was installed as Cardinal and bishop of Brescia a year later. In 1730, he became the head librarian of the Vatican Library. 1747/48 he again went on a journey through Switzerland and Bavaria. In these years, he also became a member of the Academies of Sciences of Berlin, Vienna, and Russia, and was member of the first learned society of Habsburg Monarchy, the Societas eruditorum incognitorum in terris Austriacis.

He had increasing differences with Pope Benedict XIV, though, such as over the assignment of Cardinal Passionei as pro-librarian and the pope's position in a conflict with Venice. Ultimately, these differences aggravated and led to his being sent back to his diocese in Brescia, where he died a few years later.

Quirini's writings include many works on the history of the Church, of Corfu, and of Brescia, as well as a five-volume edition of the correspondence of Cardinal Reginald Pole. In Brescia, he founded in 1745 the Biblioteca Queriniana, which still exists , and he sponsored the German missions. He also financed the completion of the St. Hedwig Church in Berlin, which is today the cathedral of the archbishopric of Berlin.

Works

External links 

Summary
Biblioteca Querinina, in Italian.

1680 births
1755 deaths
Republic of Venice clergy
18th-century Italian cardinals
Roman Catholic archbishops of Corfu
Benedictine cardinals
18th-century Venetian people
18th-century Italian Roman Catholic archbishops